Glaucia Soutinho (born 27 September 1970) is a former synchronized swimmer from Brazil.

References 

1970 births
Living people
Brazilian synchronized swimmers
Olympic synchronized swimmers of Brazil
Synchronized swimmers at the 1992 Summer Olympics